Mick O'Malley (born November 20, 1972) is an Australian professional feather/super feather/lightweight boxer of the 1990s and 2000s who won the Queensland (Australia) State super featherweight title, Australian featherweight title, Australian super featherweight title, and Commonwealth super featherweight title, and was a challenger for the Commonwealth super featherweight title against Alex Moon, his professional fighting weight varied from , i.e. featherweight to , i.e. lightweight.

Professional boxing record

References

External links

1972 births
Featherweight boxers
Lightweight boxers
Living people
Sportspeople from Geelong
Place of birth missing (living people)
Super-featherweight boxers
Australian male boxers
Commonwealth Boxing Council champions